Slander is a lost 1916 American silent drama film starring Bertha Kalich. It was directed by Will S. Davis was produced and distributed by Fox Film Corporation.

Cast
Bertha Kalich as Helene Ayers
Eugene Ormonde as Richard Tremaine
Mayme Kelso as Tremaine's Wife
Edward Van Sloan as Joseph Tremaine
Robert Rendel as Harry Carson
Warren Cook as Doctor
Charles Peyton as Tremaine's Valet (credited as C. Peyton)
T. Jerome Lawler as John Blair

See also
1937 Fox vault fire

References

External links

1916 films
American silent feature films
Lost American films
Fox Film films
Films directed by Will S. Davis
1916 drama films
American black-and-white films
Silent American drama films
1916 lost films
Lost drama films
1910s American films
1910s English-language films